Ma vie may refer to:

 "Ma vie" (Amine song), released in 2005
 "Ma vie" (Dadju song), released in 2019
 "Ma vie", a 1964 song by Alain Barrière
 Ma vie, a 1964 album by Alain Barrière